Emerald Airways was an airline based in Liverpool, United Kingdom. It operated contract and ad hoc freight services throughout the UK and Europe for postal, newspaper and freight companies and passenger services to Ireland under the brand FlyJem.

The airline ceased operations on 12 May 2006.

History 

The airline was established and started operations in 1987. It was formed by Andy Janes and his wife Hilary as Janes Aviation at Southend airport. The company was renamed Emerald in 1992, in recognition of the large amount of business across the Irish Sea and established its base in Liverpool. In October 2002, Emerald bought Exeter based Streamline Aviation. The airline was wholly owned by AS Janes and HJ Janes.

In June 2005, EuroManx successfully bought the passenger service of Emerald Airways, which was operating low cost services from Liverpool John Lennon Airport to the Isle of Man, using BAe ATPs. Following the takeover these services were then operated under the EuroManx name and booking system, but often the cabin crew employed and the planes used were those of Emerald Airways.

Following the suspension of Emerald's AOC and the company subsequently calling in administrators, one of the ATPs was impounded by the Isle of Man Government at Ronaldsway Airport.

The new Irish start-up airline, Emerald Airlines, founded in November 2020 is unrelated to Emerald Airways.

AOC Suspension

On 4 May 2006 at 20:00 the airline's Air Operators Certificate was suspended by the CAA following safety issues, the latest of which was an HS748 incident in the Channel Islands. The CAA specified that should its requirements  be met the airline's AOC would be reinstated. On 11 May 2006, administrators were appointed. As a result of the fleet grounding the firm were unable to generate any money to run the business. The AOC was revoked at the request of Emerald Airways on 7 August 2006.

Hubs 

Emerald Airways' main base was Liverpool John Lennon Airport and it had hubs at Coventry Airport, Galileo Galilei Airport (PSA), Ruzyně International Airport, Vienna International Airport and Charles de Gaulle Airport.

Fleet 
The Emerald Airways fleet included the following aircraft (at August 2006):

15 Hawker Siddeley HS 748
5 BAe ATP
1 Shorts 330
10 Shorts 360

See also
 List of defunct airlines of the United Kingdom

References 

Defunct airlines of the United Kingdom
Airlines established in 1992